Boško Buha (1926 – 27 September 1943) was a young Yugoslav Partisan and an honored icon of the Yugoslavian resistance during World War II.

Early life
Boško Buha was born into a Serb family in the Slavonian village of Gradina, near Virovitica in today's Croatia. In 1941, after the Axis invasion of the Kingdom of Yugoslavia and the establishment of the Independent State of Croatia, his family was targeted by the Ustaša and had to seek shelter in Serbia.

Career
He came to Mačva, where in 1941 he joined the Mačva detachment of the Yugoslav Partisans. He was active for a short time in the liberated Užice. After the retreat of Partisans from Serbia he joined the 2nd Proletarian Brigade of YNLA as a fighter in the 4th battalion. He soon distinguished himself as one of the most skilled bombers in a series of battles. His brigade assigned him to be their delegate to the First Congress of the Anti-fascist Youth of Yugoslavia.

At the end of 1943 Buha died when he was ambushed by Chetniks. After the war, Boško Buha received the title of People's Hero of Yugoslavia.

Legacy
A theatre house in Belgrade is named after him. In 1978, director Branko Bauer made a film about his life.

References

1926 births
1943 deaths
People from Virovitica
Serbs of Croatia
Yugoslav Partisans members
Yugoslav military personnel killed in World War II
Recipients of the Order of the People's Hero
Child soldiers in World War II
Date of birth missing

Grenadiers